Leila (also Romanized as Leyla, Leilā, and Leylā) is a 1997 Iranian film directed by Dariush Mehrjui.

Plot
Leila and Reza are a modern Iranian couple, content with their recent marriage. However, Leila learns that she is unable to conceive. Reza's mother insists that he, as the only son, must have children ("everything goes to the son"), despite Reza's insistence that he does not want children, and suggests that he get a second wife. He adamantly refuses the idea; his mother champions it. Leila gets caught between the two worlds; elated at spending time with Reza one moment and torn apart by his nagging mother the next.

References

External links

Leila at Allmovie

1997 films
Iranian drama films
1997 drama films
1990s Persian-language films
Polygamy in fiction
Films directed by Dariush Mehrjui
Films set in Iran